Neleus of Scepsis, was the son of Coriscus of Scepsis. He was a disciple of Aristotle and Theophrastus, the latter of whom bequeathed to him his library, and appointed him one of his executors. Neleus supposedly took the writings of Aristotle and Theophrastus from Athens to Scepsis, where his heirs let them languish in a cellar until the 1st century BC, when Apellicon of Teos discovered and purchased the manuscripts, bringing them back to Athens.

Notes

Further reading
 H. J. Drossart Lulofs, "Neleus of Scepsis and the Fate of the Library of the Peripatos", in Rita Beyers et al. (eds.), Tradition et traduction. Les textes philosophiques et scientifiques grecs au Moyen Age latin. Hommage à Fernand Bossier, Leuven, Leuven University Press, 1999, pp. 9-24. 

Aristotle
4th-century BC Greek people